Gout can refer to:

Gout, metabolic arthritis
Gout Fort, grape variety Chenin blanc
Goût grec, style of decorative arts
Gout plant, Jatropha podagrica
Gout-Rossignol, commune in France
The 2006 DVD of the original unaltered trilogy